Elmore may refer to:

Places

United States
Elmore, Alabama
Elmore, Illinois
Elmore, Minnesota
Elmore, Ohio
Elmore City, Oklahoma
Elmore, Vermont
Elmore, Wisconsin
Elmore County (disambiguation)
Elmore Township (disambiguation)
Lake Elmore

Australia
Elmore, Victoria

United Kingdom
Elmore, Gloucestershire, England

Fictional
Elmore, California, the town where The Amazing World of Gumball is set

Other
Elmore (name)
Elmore Magazine, American music publication founded in 2005
Elmore Manufacturing Company, a Brass Era car

See also
 
 Elsmore (disambiguation)